Niphargus wexfordensis is a species of Niphargus of the family Niphargidae endemic to County Wexford in south-eastern Ireland.

References 

Niphargidae